Tanvi Thakkar is an Indian television actress. She played in television shows include Yeh Ishq Haaye as Priyanka, Miley Jab Hum Tum as Ishika, Sarvggun Sampanna as Deepti, Pyaar Kii Ye Ek Kahaani as Maya.

Personal life
Tanvi Thakkar is a Gujarati. Her family lives in Chennai. She did her schooling in Ooty after which she went to Chennai for graduation. She moved to Mumbai to pursue a career in acting. She got engaged to her co-star, Aditya Kapadia, from Ek Doosre Se Karte Hain Pyaar Hum on 24 December 2013. The married on 16 February 2021 in a court wedding.

Career
Thakkar made her debut with the role of Ishika in Miley Jab Hum Tum on Star One. She got popularity by playing Sharmila in  Bahu Hamari Rajni Kant on Life OK and Bindya an arrogant self centered TV heroine in TV, Biwi aur Main.

Television

References

External links
 
 

Living people
Actresses from Mumbai
Indian soap opera actresses
Year of birth missing (living people)
Actresses in Hindi television
21st-century Indian actresses
Gujarati people
Actresses from Chennai